Artur Nogal (born 26 August 1990 in Warsaw) is a Polish speed skater.

Career 
He competed at the 2014 Winter Olympics in Sochi, in the 500 meters.
Artur won the bronze medal in the Team sprint event at the 2018 European Speed Skating Championships in Kolomna together with Piotr Michalski and Sebastian Kłosiński.
He is trained by Tuppu Nieminen, a retired finnish speed skater.

References

External links 
 

1990 births
Living people
Polish male speed skaters
Speed skaters at the 2014 Winter Olympics
Speed skaters at the 2018 Winter Olympics
Olympic speed skaters of Poland
Speed skaters from Warsaw